Hippocrates was an ancient Greek physician of the Age of Pericles, considered one of the most outstanding figures in the history of medicine.

Hippocrates may also refer to:

Hippocrates (physician), the name of several other physicians related to Hippocrates
Hippocrates of Chios (c. 470 – c. 410 BC), ancient Greek geometer who wrote the first known work systematizing the fundamentals of geometry
Hippocrates of Athens (died 424 BC), ancient Greek general who was slain at the battle of Delium
Hippocrates, father of Peisistratos
Hippocrates (lunar crater)
Hippocrates of Gela, ancient Greek tyrant who dominated Sicilian politics during his rule between 498 BC and 491 BC
Pseudo-Hippocrates, an anonymous writer, dubbed with the name because his works had been included in Hippocratic Corpus
Hippocrates Prize for Poetry and Medicine
"Hypocrates", song from 2012 album Electra Heart by Welsh singer Marina and the Diamonds
Hippocrate, a 2014 French film directed by Thomas Lilti

See also
Harpocrates, Greek god of silence
Hypocrite (disambiguation), similar sounding word